Eagle Township is a township in Kossuth County, Iowa, United States.

History
Eagle Township was established in 1893.

Notes

References

Townships in Kossuth County, Iowa
Townships in Iowa
1893 establishments in Iowa
Populated places established in 1893